Suneel Darshan is an Indian filmmaker, film director, producer and writer who works in the Bollywood industry.

Biography
Darshan began his career in 1987 as a film producer. He produced the film Inteqam, which starred Sunny Deol and Anil Kapoor. In 1993, he produced the film Lootere, which was directed by his brother Dharmesh Darshan, who made his directional debut with the film. The movie did well at the box office and the brothers went on to collaborate several times after that.

Suneel himself made his directional debut in 1996 with the action movie Ajay. Darshan also produced the film and wrote the dialogue for the film. The movie starred Sunny Deol and Karisma Kapoor, and did well at the box office, despite a theatre strike in Maharashtra in January 1997.

In 1999, Darshan directed and produced the action drama Jaanwar. The film marked his first collaboration with Akshay Kumar, and the film became a hit. The movie also starred Karisma Kapoor and Shilpa Shetty.

Darshan's next film was Ek Rishtaa (2001), which was written, directed and produced by him. The film starred Amitabh Bachchan, Akshay Kumar, Karisma Kapoor and Juhi Chawla. It was one of the highest grossers of the year. It was well received and critically appreciated.

After that he produced Andaaz (2003), which was a big hit, Barsaat and Dosti: Friends Forever (2005) which was one of the year's biggest hits overseas. His most recent film Shakalaka Boom Boom performed poorly at the box office.

After a seven year hiatus Darshan launched his son Shiv Darshan in his film Karle Pyaar Karle (2014). The film was declared a disaster at the Indian box office.

To celebrate Kumar's 50th birthday on September 9, 2017 Zee Cinema hosted the world premiere of Shanivaar Ki Raat Akshay Ke Saath. It showcased four of Kumar's films: Jaanwar, Andaaz, Ek Rishtaa and Dosti: Friends Forever. All were produced and directed by Darshan.

Filmography

References

External links

20th-century Indian film directors
Hindi-language film directors
Year of birth missing (living people)
Living people
21st-century Indian film directors
Hindi film producers